Hands was an American Christian metal band from Fargo, North Dakota, United States. The band started making music in 2007, with lead vocalist and guitarist Shane Ochsner, lead guitarist Ian Johnson, bass guitarist Chris Schwartz, and drummer Josh Silbernagel. Jerik Hendrickson became the band's lead guitarist in 2010, but he has since left the band, with Shane Ochsner taking over lead guitar duties. The band released one extended play, The Everlasting, independently in 2007. Their first studio album, The Sounds of Earth, was released by Oort Records in 2009. The band signed with Facedown Records, where they released Creator, a studio album, in 2009. The third studio album, Give Me Rest, was released in 2011, also on Facedown Records. The band reunited in 2017 for Facedown Fest 2017.

Background
Hands was a Christian metal band from Fargo, North Dakota. Their members at its inception in 2007, were lead vocalist and guitarist, Shane Ochsner, lead guitarist Jerik Hendrickson, bass guitarist Chris Schwartz, and drummer Josh Silbernagel. Their lead guitarist became Ian Johnson in 2010, yet he is no longer with the group as Shane Ochsner is the present lead guitarist.

Music history
The band commenced as a musical entity in 2007, with their first release, The Everlasing, an extended play, that they released independently in 2007. They released a studio album, The Sounds of Earth, on February 24, 2009, with Oort Records. They signed to Facedown Records, where they released another studio album, Creator, on July 21, 2009. Their third studio album, Give Me Rest, released by Facedown Records on July 5, 2011.

Members
Final Lineup
Shane Ochsner - vocals, guitar
Josh Silbernagel - drums
Chris Schwartz - bass
Former
Jerik Hendrickson (until 2010) - guitar
Ian Johnson - guitar
Craig Carlson - guitar

Discography
Studio albums
 The Sounds of Earth (February 24, 2009, Oort Records)
 Creator (July 21, 2009, Facedown)
 Give Me Rest (July 5, 2011, Facedown)
EPs
 The Everlasting (June 24, 2008, Independent)
 New Heaven / New Earth (February 3, 2017, Facedown)

References

External links
Official website
Encyclopaedia Metallum profile

Facedown Records artists
Rock music groups from North Dakota
Musical groups established in 2007
American Christian metal musical groups
2007 establishments in North Dakota
Metalcore musical groups from North Dakota